Gryf Wejherowo is a Polish football club in Wejherowo, Poland. The club plays in the Polish Fourth League.

Gryf Wejherowo is the oldest football club in Pomeranian Voivodeship, and for several years was the only club in the region playing in the Polish Third League. It is well known in Poland for reaching the 2011–12 Polish Cup quarterfinals after beating clubs from the Polish Premier League and the Polish First League.

Football team 

. Previously there was an ultras group of supporters called  – which prepared banners, flags, and chanted at all of the matches – but dissolved after supporters started to boycott  because of a conflict with the club's management. The latter of the two is also one of 's local rivals. Most of the  fans also support .

 does not just have one or two rivals, but has several clubs that clearly have feelings of animosity towards them.

's first shirt sponsor was the town council of Wejherowo until 2004. The next sponsor was Northpol, and from 2007 to 2014, the  strategic sponsor was Orlex, which supported the club with 500,000zł every year, and starting in 2012 Orlex became Gryf Wejherowo's title sponsor. Some of the secondary sponsors were: Northpol, and PKS Wejherowo. Since 2015-16 season the club does not have any shirt sponsors.

Roster 

The football managers were:

Colours 

The home colours have always been yellow and black, the Kashubians national colors. The numbers have always been black.

The away colours were previously all-black with yellow accents, including the socks. But there were also several years in the 1990s, when the away jersey was pink and black. During the 2010–2012 seasons, the away jersey stripes were changed to their sponsor's colours: red, navy blue and white, however they were dropped. Currently the away jersey is a white shirt with black bars on the shoulders, worn with black shorts and white socks.

Sports club

History 

In April 1921, a  nest was the first gymnastics association organized in Wejherowo. Wejherowo's sports movement regularly organized various competitions and hosted nationally renowned tournaments including the "", a tennis blue riband event in which players such as Ignacy Tłoczyński, and Jadwiga Jędrzejowska competed. The development of this sports movement was stopped by World War II.

After in April 1945, all sport clubs in Wejherowo merged. In 1952 the club name was changed to "."  was considered the most important of them all.

The heritage of Interwar period sports clubs was mainly dominated by boxing.
 Gryf was also a club for boxers; past members who competed for the club include Olympic medal winners Hubert Skrzypczak and Henryk Dampc.
On a side note,  had also won the Polish women's team bowling cup during this period.

In the 1970s, the club's football team was promoted to the third tier of the Polish football league system but was demoted three years later. Football's popularity grew in Wejherowo and eventually dominated over the club's other sports. Football in Wejherowo even kept its popularity supreme over basketball, during the 1980s, when basketball was making some headway and accomplishing minor achievements.

By 1998, the team returned to the previous division as " Gryf Wejherowo" and won a Regional Polish Cup. In 1995, some of the club's athletes left the team and founded a new club,  Wejher Wejherowo.

During the years 1999–2004 were definitely the most difficult in the club's history. The club was in debt to the amount of 300,000 zł, which was equivalent to £43,336 as of 2004. For a time, until 2002, the club was not exclusively focused on football but also bowling and duplicate bridge. The team was the only club from the region which played in the pre-2008  season. During that time, it included a few players, such as Dawid Pomorski and Wojciech Pięta, who are widely regarded today as legends.

Rafał Szlas became the  chairman in 2004. In 2006, the team reached the 4th tier, and gained a new club sponsor: The Orlex Company. Renusz immediately started to trade for new young and talented players, like Grzegorz Gicewicz and Przemysław Kostuch, who are still playing for Gryf. In fact, Gicewicz and Kostuch are widely considered two of the best players in the club's history. In May 2011, former  player  was hired as the team manager. With Niciński's arrival, he has changed the club's winning average into one of the best in the Pomeranian Voivodeship, to boot, he led the club to win another Polish regional cup. Unfortunately, Niciński was banned in 2012 for eight months by the Polish Football Association for participating in a 2004 match-fixing scandal, while he was a player. The team's temporary manager became Dariusz Mierzejewski who managed until July 2013. In July 2016 Mariusz Pawlak became new Gryf Wejherowo's manager.

In 2011, a book about the club's history was published: 9 Dekad Gryfa.

Honours 

 One Polish Women's Team Bowling Cup
 Four Polish Regional FA Cups: 1997–1998, 1999–2000, 2002–2003, 2010–2011

Crest 

Gryf Wejherowo's crest is a black Kashubian griffin with a crown, turned to the left on a basic gold shield surrounded by a blue, white and gold circle where the club's name is accompanied by a six-pointed star.

Venue 

 Gryf Wejherowo plays its home matches at  "" Stadium, which is located in the forest south of Wejherowo. The stadium was built between 1924 and 1927 and has two grass pitches: the main pitch is on the central part of the plot of land, and the smaller pitch is reserved for training, and is on an elevated part of the plot of land located to the south. Initially the area was designed for a military shooting range. The stadium's maximum capacity is 2,500, however there are only 1,050 seats.

The stadium has floodlights but it is still not possible to play an official match at night there.

Officials 

The current club officials are:
Chairman: Piotr Ruszewski
Co-chairmen: Sylwester Maszota, Dariusz Mikołajczak
Director of football: Wiesław Renusz

See also
Lower Level Football Leagues in Interwar Poland

Notes

References

External links 
 Polish football database

 
1921 establishments in Poland
Association football clubs established in 1921
Football clubs in Pomeranian Voivodeship